Leslie Mills (14 July 1914 – 27 February 2000) was an Australian cricketer. He played four first-class matches for Western Australia between 1937/38 and 1938/39.

See also
 List of Western Australia first-class cricketers

References

External links
 

1914 births
2000 deaths
Australian cricketers
Western Australia cricketers